The 1937 Coronation Honours in New Zealand, celebrating the coronation of George VI, were appointments made by the King to various orders and honours to reward and highlight good works by New Zealanders. The honours were announced on 11 May 1937.

The recipients of honours are displayed here as they were styled before their new honour.

Privy Counsellor (PC)
 George Vere Arundell, Viscount Galway  – governor-general of New Zealand.

Knight Bachelor
 Ernest Davis – mayor of the City of Auckland.
 Charles John Boyd Norwood – of Wellington. For public services.

Order of the Bath

Companion (CB)
Military division, additional
 Rear-Admiral the Honourable Edmund Rupert Drummond  – Royal Navy; commodore commanding the New Zealand station.
 Major-General John Evelyn Duigan   – New Zealand Staff Corps; general officer commanding and chief of the general staff, New Zealand Military Forces.

Order of Saint Michael and Saint George

Knight Grand Gross (GCMG)
Additional
 The Right Honourable Sir Michael Myers  – Chief Justice of New Zealand.

Knight Commander (KCMG)
Additional
 Algernon Phillips Withiel Thomas – emeritus professor, Auckland University College. For services to education.

Order of the British Empire

Commander (CBE)
Civil division, additional
 Te Puea Hērangi – of Ngāruawāhia; a Māori princess. For social-welfare services.
 Henry Ernest Moston – of Wellington; assistant secretary, Department of Labour.

Military division, additional
 Colonel Stephen Charles Phillip Nicholls   – New Zealand Staff Corps; officer commanding, Southern Command, New Zealand Military Forces, Christchurch.
 Wing Commander Thomas Martin Wilkes  – Royal New Zealand Air Force; director air series and controller of civil aviation, Wellington.

Officer (OBE)
Civil division, additional
 John Higgins – engineer, Grey County Council.
 Campbell Frederick Schadick – engineer, Buller County Council.
 Elizabeth Best Taylor  – of Christchurch. For social-welfare services.
 Sydney Lough Thompson – of Christchurch. For services to art.
 Annie Maria Ward – of Lumsden; formerly president of the Women's Division of the New Zealand Farmers' Union.
 Helen Wilson – of Piopio; president of the Women's Division of the New Zealand Farmers' Union.

Military division, additional
 Paymaster-Commander Edward Loftus Tottenham – Royal Navy; naval secretary and member of the Naval Board.
 Lieutenant-Colonel Henry Beresford Maunsell  – officer commanding, Wellington East Coast Mounted Rifles (Territorial Forces), New Zealand Military Forces.

Member (MBE)
Civil division, additional
 Mary Boyce – matron, St Helen's (Maternity) Hospital, Christchurch.
 Althea Harriet Cookson – matron, Wellington Public Hospital.
 Alicia Campbell Ingles – matron, Pukeora Sanatorium, Waipukurau.
 Ella Dorothy Winifred Leslie – nurse-inspector, Department of Health.
 Miriam Mayze – matron, Auckland Mental Hospital.
 Janet Morgan – matron, Alexandra Home (Maternity Hospital), Wellington.
 Rose Muir – matron, Christchurch Public Hospital (1916–1936).
 Clarissa Eliza McLaren – matron, Seacliff Mental Hospital.
 Emily May Nutsey  – matron, Auckland Public Hospital.
 Edith Penelope Tennent – matron, Dunedin Public Hospital.

Military division, additional
 Warrant Officer Class II, Battery Sergeant-Major Walker Daniel Dean – Fifth Battery, New Zealand Artillery (Territorial Forces), New Zealand Military Forces. 
 Warrant Officer Class II, Staff Sergeant-Major Charles Thomas Rae McLean – New Zealand Artillery, New Zealand Military Forces.

Companion of the Imperial Service Order (ISO)
 Alfred Hyde Cockayne – of Wellington; director general, Department of Agriculture.
 James Havelock Jerram – of Wellington; general manager of the State Fire and Accident Insurance Office.
 Nelson Thomas Lambourne  – of Wellington; Director of Education.
 William Robertson – of Wellington; under-secretary and land purchase controller, Department of Lands and Survey.

References

Coronation Honours
1937 awards
1937 in New Zealand
New Zealand awards
Honours (New Zealand)